Steve Holman (born March 5, 1954 in Lawrence, Massachusetts) is an American sports broadcaster, most noted for his work as the play-by-play radio broadcaster for the Atlanta Hawks of the National Basketball Association.

At the end of the 2021-2022 NBA season Steve is at 2,827consecutive Hawks broadcasts. That puts him only behind Chick Hearn whose record stands at 3,338 consecutive games. Holman broadcast his 1,500th consecutive Hawks game on March 5, 2007—his 53rd birthday. His 1700th consecutive Hawks broadcast came in the 2009 playoffs.  His 2,000th consecutive broadcast was on Wednesday, January 16, 2013 when the Hawks played the Brooklyn Nets. 

The 2021-22 NBA season was his 37th with the Atlanta Hawks.  Holman has also covered the Atlanta Falcons and Atlanta Chiefs (soccer) and Georgia Tech baseball since moving to Atlanta in 1980.

Holman began his NBA career in the early 1970s as a broadcast assistant to legendary Boston Celtics’ play-by-play voice Johnny Most. He first filled in for Most in 1976 when Most went hoarse during a game. His first radio job was at WCCM in Lawrence, where he was hired by station owner Curt Gowdy.

Holman also covered the 1996 Olympic Games in Atlanta, calling radio play-by-play action for the United States men’s and women’s Gold Medal basketball teams, as well as boxing.

References
1,500th game
Hawks bio

1954 births
Living people
Atlanta Falcons announcers
Atlanta Hawks announcers
National Basketball Association broadcasters
National Football League announcers
People from Lawrence, Massachusetts
College baseball announcers in the United States
Association football commentators
Boxing commentators
Olympic Games broadcasters